James Robert Hoffman (June 12, 1932 – February 8, 2003) was an American prelate of the Roman Catholic Church. He served as Bishop of Toledo from 1981 until his death in 2003.  He previously served as an auxiliary bishop of the same diocese from 1978 to 1980.

Early life 
James Hoffman was born on June 12, 1932, in Fremont, Ohio.  He studied at St. Meinrad Seminary in St. Meinrad, Indiana and St. Mary Seminary in Norwood, Ohio. 

Hoffman was ordained to the priesthood by Bishop George Rehring for the Diocese of Toledo on July 28, 1957. He then served as a curate at the following Ohio parishes:

 St. Peter's in Mansfield 
 St. Joseph's in Marblehead 
 Blessed Sacrament in Toledo

In 1966, Hoffman earned a Licentiate of Canon Law from the Catholic University of America in Washington, D.C. Hoffman was later named secretary to Bishop John Donovan and chancellor of the diocese. In addition to these duties, he also served as pastor of St. Joseph's Parish in Sylvania, Ohio.

Auxiliary Bishop and Bishop of Toledo 
On April 18, 1978, Hoffman was appointed as an auxiliary bishop of the Diocese of Toledo and Titular Bishop of Italica by Pope Paul VI. He received his episcopal consecration on June 23, 1978, from Bishop Donovan, with Archbishop Joseph Bernardin and Bishop Albert Ottenweller serving as co-consecrators. Hoffman selected as his episcopal motto: "Omnia Omnibus", meaning, "All things to all men". 

Hoffman was named by Pope John Paul II as the sixth bishop of Toledo on December 16, 1980. He was installed by Archbishop Bernardin at Rosary Cathedral in Toledo on February 17, 1981.

Hoffman was criticized for his handling of sexual abuse cases in the diocese, which had 11 lawsuits filed against it. In 1992, he placed the Rev. Robert J. Fisher in active ministry after the latter admitted to molesting a 14-year-old girl and spent 30 days in prison. He later suspended Fisher in 2002 due to "the media climate," but said he had no plans to remove other such priests. He later declared, "My difficulty with zero tolerance is that the Gospel teaches reconciliation. We believe in forgiveness."

James Hoffman died from cancer at the Ursuline Center in Toledo on February 8, 2003, at age 70. He is buried at St. Ann Cemetery in Fremont.

References

1932 births
2003 deaths
Roman Catholic bishops of Toledo
20th-century Roman Catholic bishops in the United States
Catholic University of America alumni
People from Fremont, Ohio